Salinirubellus salinus is an halophile archaeal species. It was first isolated from a marine solar saltern in Zhejiang Province in China. It is the only known species in the genus Salinirubellus.

References

Monotypic archaea genera
Euryarchaeota
Taxa described in 2018

Archaea described in 2018